During 1967-68 season Milan Associazione Calcio competed in Serie A, Coppa Italia and the European Cup Winners' Cup.

Summary 
The only time that Milan won the league title so early was back on 31 March 1968. After four titles during the 1950s, the Rossoneri's pace had actually slowed during the following decade as they won just two league titles. However, their second was that of 1968 – a year before their famous European Cup victory. Incidentally, 12 months prior to Milan's Scudetto celebrations in 1968, the prospect of winning the league was unthinkable. Arturo Silvestri's Rossoneri had finished eighth in the league standings, with the only positive being that of our Coppa Italia victory in Rome against Padova on 14 June 1967.

Nereo Rocco's return at the start of the 1967-68 campaign was certainly part of this revival – the team achieving a complete turnaround under his guidance. With Sormani and Prati given more emphasis and Anquilletti fully introduced, the roles of Rivera, Trapattoni, Rosato and Lodetti were also strengthened. New arrivals included: Cudicini, Schnellinger, Malatrasi and Hamrin. And so was born the Milan side that not only won the Scudetto with four games to go before the end of the season – with a Napoli side containing Juliano and Alfatini being their only true opposition – but also beating Hamburg to claim the European Cup Winners' Cup in Rotterdam.

Squad 

(Captain)

Transfers

Competitions

Serie A

League table

Matches

Coppa Italia

First round

Second round

Quarterfinals

Final round

European Cup Winners' Cup

Round of 32

Eightfinals

Quarterfinals

Semifinals

Final

Statistics

See also 
 A.C. Milan

References

External links 
 
 
RSSSF – Italy 1967/68

A.C. Milan seasons
Milan
Italian football championship-winning seasons
UEFA Cup Winners' Cup-winning seasons